WME may refer to:
 Windows Media Encoder
 Wireless Multimedia Extensions
 Wintermute Engine, a graphical adventure game engine by Dead:Code software
 William Morris Endeavor, a talent agency conglomerate
 Web-based Mathematics Education
 Working Memory Element in the Rete algorithm
 The IATA code for Mount Keith Airport in Western Australia
 Waze Map Editor
 National Rail station code for Woodmansterne railway station in London